Harry, Harri or Harrie Koorstra (1930?–2004?) is a former Dutch sprint canoeist who competed in the late 1940s and early 1950s. He canoed for the Amsterdam club "Viking" and usually paired with Piet Bakker of the same club. They won a bronze medal in the K-2 1000 m event at the 1950 ICF Canoe Sprint World Championships in Copenhagen.

References

Dutch male canoeists
Possibly living people
Sportspeople from Amsterdam
ICF Canoe Sprint World Championships medalists in kayak
Year of birth uncertain
20th-century Dutch people